

Group 5 

All times are local

5